Ivan Konjević (born 9 February 1971) is a retired Croatian football defender.

Club career
Born in Novi Banovci, back in SFR Yugoslavia, he begin playing in Serbia with FK Partizan which sent him on loan to their satellite club FK Teleoptik, and next to FK Zemun.

In 1994 he moved to Germany where in a decade from 1994 till 2004 he played with SpVgg Ludwigsburg, Rot-Weiß Oberhausen, Rot-Weiss Essen and FC Augsburg.

References

1971 births
Living people
People from Stara Pazova
Association football defenders
Croatian footballers
FK Partizan players
FK Teleoptik players
FK Zemun players
SpVgg Ludwigsburg players
Rot-Weiß Oberhausen players
Rot-Weiss Essen players
FC Augsburg players
2. Bundesliga players
Croatian expatriate footballers
Expatriate footballers in Germany
Croatian expatriate sportspeople in Germany